Guillermo Garcia Gonzalez (9 December 1953 in Santa Clara – 26 October 1990 in Havana) was a Cuban chess Grandmaster.

External links

1953 births
1990 deaths
People from Santa Clara, Cuba
Chess grandmasters
Cuban chess players
20th-century chess players